Compsoctena primella is a moth in the Eriocottidae family. It was described by Zeller in 1852. It is found in South Africa.

References

Endemic moths of South Africa
Moths described in 1852
Compsoctena
Lepidoptera of South Africa